Onogawa may refer to:

Onogawa Kisaburō, the 5th Yokozuna in sumo
Kitataiki Akeyoshi, sumo wrestler with the elder name Onogawa
Ōno River, a river that begins in Ōita Prefecture, Japan